Orthogonia grisea is a moth of the family Noctuidae. It is found in China, including Sichuan.

Xyleninae